Tony Quan, tag name Tempt One or Tempt1, is an American graffiti artist who began writing in Los Angeles in the early 1980s. His style combined the city's local cholo writing culture with New York's hip-hop lettering to create a uniquely Los Angeles style.

In 2003, Tempt was diagnosed with the degenerative nerve disorder ALS. Now fully paralyzed except for his eyes, Quan has been able to use the EyeWriter to continue his art.

References

External links 
 eyewriter.org
 fffff.at - Tempt’s EyeTags are uploaded directly to this page
 Mick Ebeling's TEDTalk about TEMPT1

American graffiti artists
Living people
People with motor neuron disease
Year of birth missing (living people)